Jeroen van der Lely (born 22 March 1996) is a Dutch footballer who plays for USV Hercules as a right back. During his professional career, he played for Twente and Vendsyssel FF.

Club career
Born in Nijverdal, Overijssel, Van der Lely is a youth exponent from FC Twente. He made his Eerste Divisie debut on 23 February 2015 against De Graafschap in a 3–1 home win.

On the transfer deadline day, 2 September 2019, Van der Lely joined Danish second division club Vendsyssel FF after a trial. However, the club announced on 2 January 2020 that they intended to cut down on the number of players, and Van der Lely was one of three players that would be cut. 

On 13 May 2020, Van der Lely announced his retirement, citing a lack of motivation and passion for playing professional football. Instead, he opted to study literary science at Utrecht University. In January 2021, he started playing football again on an amateur level with USV Hercules while continuing his studies.

Honours

Club
Twente
Eerste Divisie: 2018–19

References

External links
 

1996 births
Living people
People from Hellendoorn
Association football fullbacks
Dutch footballers
Dutch expatriate footballers
FC Twente players
Vendsyssel FF players
Eredivisie players
Eerste Divisie players
Tweede Divisie players
Derde Divisie players
Danish 1st Division players
Dutch expatriate sportspeople in Denmark
Expatriate men's footballers in Denmark
Utrecht University alumni
Footballers from Overijssel
USV Hercules players
Jong FC Twente players